Mary Darling may refer to:

 Mary Darling (television producer), CEO and co-owner of WestWind Pictures
 Mary Darling (fictional character), a character in Peter Pan
 Mary Darling (Civil War nurse), Confederate nurse during the American Civil War